Siloam Springs School District 21  is a school district in Benton County, Arkansas, headquartered in Siloam Springs.

The district has territory in Benton County and Washington County. In addition to Siloam Springs, the district includes all of Cincinnati in Washington County, and a small section of Gentry in Benton County,

Schools
Secondary:
 Siloam Springs High School (9-12)
 Siloam Springs Middle School (7-8)

Primary:
 Siloam Springs Intermediate School (5-6)
 Southside Elementary School (3-4)
 Delbert "Pete" & Pat Allen Elementary School (1-2)
 Northside Elementary School (preschool and kindergarten)

Alternative:
 Main Street Academy (9-12)

References

External links
 
 
School districts in Arkansas
Education in Benton County, Arkansas
Education in Washington County, Arkansas